The Hockey Girls (Catalan: Les de l'hoquei)  is a 2019 Catalan-language TV series produced by Brutal Media and TV3, which is the official Catalan channel. It was premiered on April 29, 2019. It was, initially, a final degree project of 4 students who studied "Comunicació Audiovisual" (translated as: "audiovisual communication") at the Universitat Pompeu Fabra: Laura Azemar, Ona Anglada, Natàlia Boadas i Marta Vivet. They presented the project to Pitching Audiovisual of the Audiovisual Cluster of Catalonia , whose main goal is to connect and create a network with all the elements and institutions of the audiovisual area. It aroused interest from different Catalan production companies, among which was found Brutal Media, which finally shaped the project. It is about a girls’ roller hockey team and a community of people involved with hockey.

The series was awarded with the equality prize of CIMA in the FesTVal. CIMA is an association set up by women which expects to encourage the presence of women in the audiovisual media.

It was added to the Netflix catalogue in September 2019.

Synopsis 
When Germán, coach of the Club Patí Minerva women's hockey team, decides to leave them in order to train the rival team called "Olímpic", the club president (Enric Ricou) decides that the best solution is to get rid of the team because of economic problems and because he does not believe in female sport. The team players, who are Berta, Emma, Laila, Lorena, Raquel and Flor and who are in high school, struggle to save the women's team in their club while they try to find their place inside and outside the team.

At the same time, Anna Ricou, who is Emma's sister and who had won the Spanish and European Championships during her experience in the club, returns home from Lisbon to recover from an injury and get away with the darkest episode of her sportive career: she caused the coma of one of her teammates after a fight. Finally, Anna gets involved with the girls’ team and she's asked to coach them.

Themes 
So many powerful themes and storylines are brought into the series. There are stories around women's rights, women's agency, pregnancy, abortion, sex, family relationships, ADHD, corruption, body image, team spirit, racism, teamwork, responsibility, sexuality, and coming of age.

Cast 
The main characters are:

  as Anna Ricou Mas.
  as Berta Figuera Terrats.
  as Emma Ricou Mas.
  as Laila Bakri.
  as Lorena Sánchez Ballart.
  as Raquel Alcober Monforte.
 Asia Ortega as Florencia 'Flor' Vilamayor.
  as Janina Díaz.
  as Gina Camps.

The other characters are:

 David Selvas i Jansana as Toni Alcober Marín.
 Nil Cardoner i Gratacós as Òscar Sánchez Ballart.
 Nora Navas Garcia as Júlia Terrats Herraiz
 David Solans as Ricard Planes Rius.
 Xúlio Abonjo Escudero as "el Pela".
 Mireia Aixalà i Rosselló as Sílvia Ballart Monteserín.
 Guillermo Lasheras i Tebar as Quim Puigdevall Centelles or called «Putxi».
 Marc Clotet i Fresquet as Germán Ruestes Hernández.
 Juli Fàbregas i Elías as Santi Ricou Prats.
 Pablo Hernández as Nil Ricou Montagut.
 Gemma Brió i Zamora as Olga Terrats Herraiz.
 Hamid Krim as Youssef Bakri.
 Josep Linuesa i Guerrera as Enric Ricou Prats
 Jan Mediavilla as Bernat.
 Aida Oset as Montse Pagès Cuesta
 Guim Puig i Mas as Lluc Ferrer Raventós.
 Àgata Roca i Maragall as Núria Mas Pujol.
 Romina Cocca as Paulina Vilamayor Astudillo.
 Ivana Miño as Susanna Monforte.
 Arnau Casanovas as Jordi Garriga Lozano.

Characters 

 Anna: she has been playing professional hockey in Lisbon when an injury sends her home. As if the injury wasn't enough trouble, she left one of her teammates in a coma after an argument in the locker room. That problem haunts her both mentally and legally. She will become the coach of the women's team. She is competitive, intelligent, independent and honest.
 Berta: she is the captain of Minerva's Female Team. She wants to be a doctor. Her mother is in a mental hospital so she lives with her aunt Terrats.
 Emma: she can be a problem. She is only 16 and very emotional. She's interested in music. When her dad and mom go to Budapest to work, she's left with Anna, who can't control her very well. She was adopted when she was very young and, although both her parents and sister have never treated her differently, she now finds it hard to find her place in the family. She is Laila's best friend.
 Laila: she is of Moroccan descent. Her dad Youssef takes the family to Morocco each summer. She is a shy, nervous, introverted girl. Laila doesn't do well at school and wants to drop out to be an artist. She loves manga, drawing and skateboarding.
 Lorena: is a free spirited lesbian and she is a cheerful and optimistic girl. Her father is a rock musician who doesn't live with them. She aspires to be as free as he is. She has a brother called Oscar on the boys' hockey team. Her mom, Silvia, is in a romance with Enric.
 Raquel: is the goalie and the goalkeeper of Minerva's female team. She has one problem at home that we don't learn about until season 2: she is the daughter of some publicists who spoil her a lot, but they don't pay much attention to her. She has a big argument in her episode about being ready for sex. At first, her boyfriend is Oscar.
 Flor: she is from Argentina. She's the power player on the team or one of the best players. She is strong, solitary, romantic and competitive. She has a girlfriend back home. When that falls apart she looks closer to where she's living now for a little romance.
 Gina: she is a genius with social media and helps the team gather fans and prove themselves to Enric. She's a figure skater, but joins the hockey team midway through the season. She's crazy about Lorena. Lorena is crazy  about Gina, too, but Lorena isn't very good at monogamy.
 Oscar: Lorena's brother who also plays hockey.
 Germán: he's moving on to take over a better team for more money. Anna and Germán were together in the past, and their feelings linger. But he's now living with Montse, his partner, who is also a lawyer.
 Enric Ricou: he is the person who runs the sports center. Enric hates the girls’ hockey team and doesn't want them around. The girls have to fight him every inch of the way just to play. Also, he is Anna's and Emma's uncle.
 Terrats: a physical therapist who will help Anna with her injury. She's also a coach at the Sports Center and Anna's boss there.
 Youssef: Laila's father. He runs the bar where everyone hangs out and where much of the action takes place.

Episodes

First Season

Second season

Release 
The Hockey Girls was released on April 29, 2019 on TV3.

Places 
The series was shot in different places in the area of Vallès Occidental, Catalonia. The sports centre called Pavelló Municipal Maria Victor  de l'Hoquei Club Palau de Plegamans  was the main location. Also, we could highlight, the church of Santa Maria de Palau-solità  or the streets of the town. Another important place was the farmhouse located in Canovelles which is called as "Can Marquès".

Soundtrack 
The official website of the series highlights 7 songs of the soundtrack, which are the most successful or popular ones.

The first one is the main theme of the soundtrack, "Juntes" (together), which has some features related to hip-hop, Soul and R&B. It is sung by a 23-year-old Catalan singer called Kyle, who also has written and composed it. She has about 9.000 followers on YouTube and 15.000 on Instagram.

The second one comes from the second episode, which starts with the song "Dones" (women), sung by Tesa, Andrea, JazzWoman and Ery.

The third one comes from the moment of the scene between Gina and Lorena in the fourth episode. The song is called "Adicta" (addicted) and it is sung by Lennis Rodriguez.

The others are:

 "Maleducado" (rude), which is Lildami's trap song. 
 "Pedres als ulls" (stones in the eyes), El Petit de Cal Eril. 
 "Valentina", 31 Fam.

References

External links
 
 

Catalan television programmes
2010s Spanish drama television series
2019 Spanish television series debuts
Spanish sports television series
2020s Spanish drama television series
Catalan-language television shows